Trowbarrow Quarry is a disused limestone quarry near Silverdale, Lancashire, England, which is a geological Site of Special Scientific Interest and a Local Nature Reserve. It is a popular rock climbing area.

History
The quarry produced limestone for use in construction, industry and agriculture, starting when the Furness Line railway opened nearby in 1857, providing a means of moving the output. A new method to produce Tarmacadam was developed, using hot tar from the gasworks at nearby Carnforth to mix with crushed limestone.  The quarry closed in 1959, having employed 20 to 30 men for most of its active life.

The site is now managed as part of the Arnside and Silverdale Area of Outstanding Natural Beauty.

References

External links
 

Map of Trowbarrow Quarry Nature Reserve

Sites of Special Scientific Interest in Lancashire
Local Nature Reserves in Lancashire
Geography of the City of Lancaster